Keith Copeland (born in New York City on April 18, 1946, died in Germany on February 14, 2015) was a jazz drummer and music educator.

Career
His father, Ray Copeland, was a jazz trumpeter, and he learned by watching him, but he decided to play drums after studying Art Blakey's records with The Jazz Messengers.

In his teens he played with Barry Harris. He later worked with the Heath Brothers, but Percy Heath disliked his style, leading to arguments and to Copeland quitting.

During his musical career, Copeland played with Sam Jones, Billy Taylor, Johnny Griffin, Stevie Wonder, Rory Stuart, George Russell, and Hank Jones.  He also led his own European-based groups, including one with Irish bassist Ronan Guilfoyle.

Copeland taught at The New School University in New York City, Rutgers, and Berklee College of Music before moving to Germany in 1992 and teaching in the Hochschule system. His students include Terri Lyne Carrington, Darren Beckett and Adam Cruz.

Discography

As leader
 On Target (Jazz Mania, 1993)
 The Irish Connection (SteepleChase, 1996)
 Round Trip (SteepleChase, 1997)
 Postcard from Vancouver (Jazz Focus, 1998)

As sideman
With Howard Alden
 Misterioso (Concord Jazz, 1991)
With Ben Besiakov
 You Stepped Out of a Dream (SteepleChase, 1990)
With Paul Bley
 BeBopBeBopBeBopBeBop (SteepleChase, 1990)
With Joshua Breakstone
Echoes (Contemporary, 1987)
Evening Star (Contemporary, 1988)
Sittin' on the Thing with Ming (Capri, 1993)
Remembering Grant Green (Evidence, 1993)
The Music of Bud Powell (Double Time, 2000)
Tomorrow's Hours (Capri, 2002)
With Charles Brown
 All My Life (Bullseye Blues, 1990)
With Chris Conner
 As Time Goes by (Enja, 1992)
With Stanley Cowell
 Sienna (SteepleChase, 1989)
 Departure #2 (SteepleChase, 1990)
 Hear Me One (SteepleChase, 1996)
With Meredith d'Ambrosio
 The Cove (Sunnyside, 1988)
 Love Is Not a Game (Sunnyside, 1991)
With John Dankworth
 Echoes of Harlem (Compendia, 1988)
With Stanton Davis
 Brighter Days (Outrageous Records Incorporated, 1977)
With Frank Foster and the SDR Big Band
 A Fresh Taste of the Blues (Intercord, 1996)
With Hugh Frasier/Jean Toussaint Quartet
 Back to Back (Jazz Focus, 1998)
With David Gazarov
 Autumnal Giant Steps (Episode Records, 1994)
With Al Grey
 Christmas Stockin' Stuffer (Capri, 1992)
With Johnny Griffin
Return of the Griffin (Galaxy, 1978)
With Johnny Hartman
Once in Every Life (Bee Hive, 1980)
With the Heath Brothers
 In Motion (Columbia, 1979)

With Sam Jones
 The Bassist! (Interplay, 1979)
With Mark Kirk
 Lavender Mist (Jazz Mania, 1993) with Steve Gilmore
With Ann Malcolm
 Incident'ly (Sound Hills Records, 1994)
With Susannah McCorkle
 I'll Take Romance (Concord Jazz, 1992)
With Sandy McLeod
 Conversations with Love (CGM, 2003)
With Jackie Paris
 Nobody Else but Me (Audiophile, 1988)
With Bill Pierce
 Complete William the Conqueror Sessions (Sunnyside, 1995)
With Mike Richmond
 Dance for Andy (SteepleChase) (1989)
With Bob Rockwell
 Shades of Blue (SteepleChase, 1996)
With Charlie Rouse
The Upper Manhattan Jazz Society (Enja, 1981 [1985]) with Benny Bailey
With George Russell
 Electronic Sonata for Souls Loved by Nature (Soul Note, 1980)
 So What (Blue Note, 1987)
With Perico Sambeat
 Uptown Dance (EGT, 1992)
With Larry Schneider
 Just Cole Porter (SteepleChase, 1991)
 Blind Date (SteepleChase, 1992)
 Freedom Jazz Dance (Steeplechase, 1996) 
With Jurgen Seefelder
 Naide (Westwind Records, 1996)
With Louis Smith
 Ballads for Lulu (SteepleChase, 1990)
 Once in a While (SteepleChase, 2000)
With Rory Stuart
 Hurricane (Sunnyside, 1986)
With Billy Taylor
 Where've You Been? (Concord Jazz, 1981)
With Chris Walden
 Ticino (ACT, 1996)
With Chris White
 The Chris White Project (Muse, 1992)
With Martin Wind
 Gone with the Wind (September, 1993) with Bill Mays
 Tender Waves (A Records, 1995)

References

External links 
Keith Copeland website - archived 27 September 2022

1946 births
2015 deaths
American jazz drummers
Academic staff of the Hochschule für Musik und Tanz Köln
Queens College, City University of New York faculty
Rutgers University faculty
The New School faculty
Jazz musicians from New York (state)